= The Fencing Illini =

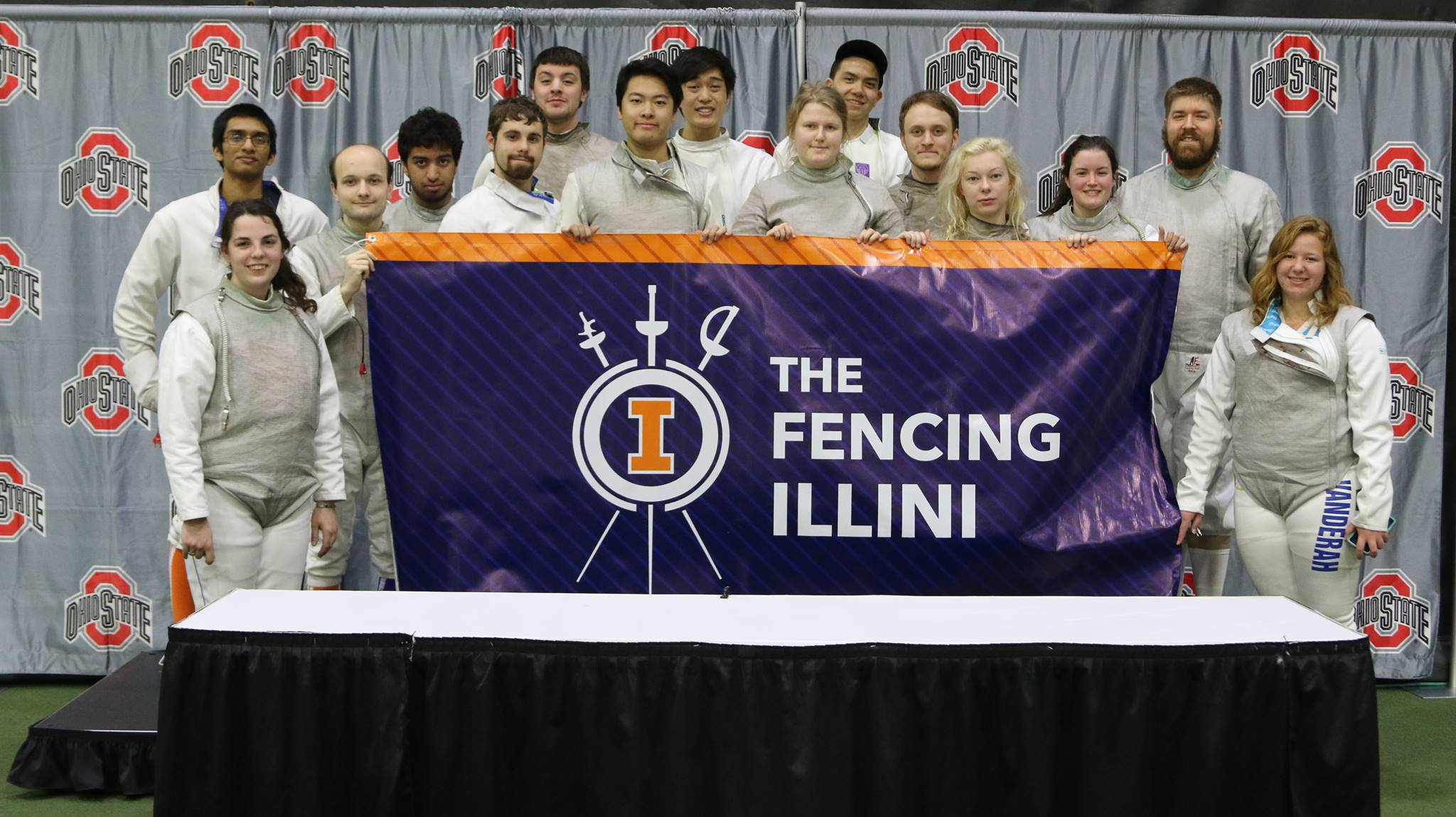
The Fencing Illini at the MFC Championships 2015-2016

The University of Illinois Urbana-Champaign Fighting Illini men's fencing team was established in 1911. They won two national championships in 1956 and in 1958. On October 12, 1989, the Chicago Tribune reported that three members of the team had burned a part of the AstroTurf on the Memorial Stadium field. They were later arrested for the crime. In 1993, the varsity team was dropped as well as the men's swimming and the men's and women's diving team due to budget cuts and a few other reasons, including Title IX, which was starting to take real effect on school athletics.

== Current Fencing at UIUC ==
After the team was dropped, a fencing club was created. The current RSO (registered student organization) on campus goes by the name "the Fencing Illini". The club teaches students the sport of fencing at the Point Fencing Club and School as well as compete in the Midwestern Fencing Conference for collegiate fencing. There are no try-outs and the team is composed of students at the University of Illinois with varying skill level.

The club practices at the Point Fencing Club and School and participates in competitions there. In 2015, the Point was interviewed by a local online journal, and the current President of the RSO as well other fencers from the club helped out in demonstrating the sport of fencing for the community.
